The 2017–18 Moldovan Women's Cup was the 21st season of the Moldovan annual football tournament. The competition started on 4 October 2017 and concluded with the final at the Zimbru Stadium on 3 June 2018. A total of nine teams had their entries to the tournament.

Preliminary round

Quarter-finals

First legs

Second legs

Semi-finals

First legs

Second legs

Final

The final was played on 3 June 2018 at the Zimbru Stadium in Chișinău.

References

Moldovan Women's Cup seasons
Moldovan Women's Cup 2017-18
Moldova